The Nokia 6210 Navigator is a smartphone made by Nokia that is a successor to Nokia 6110 Navigator. It was announced on February 11, 2008 and had been available from July 2008. It runs on Symbian OS v9.3 with a S60 3rd Edition FP2 user interface.

The Nokia 6210 Navigator is the third phone in the Navigator series to be released by Nokia. The Nokia 6210 Navigator includes pre-loaded navigation maps with a free navigation license for 6 months. It is also the company's first device with a built-in magnetic compass.

It should not be confused with the Nokia 6210 from 2000.

It was succeeded by the Nokia 6710 Navigator.

Accelerometer 
The 6210 Navigator includes a built-in accelerometer. This was originally only used for video stabilization and photo orientation (to keep landscape or portrait shots oriented as taken).

Nokia Research Center has allowed an application interface directly to the accelerometer, allowing software to use the data from it. Nokia has released an application to demonstrate this.

Third-party programs have been created, including software that will automatically change the screen orientation when the phone is tilted, programs that simulate the sounds of a Star Wars lightsaber when the phone is waved through the air, allow you to mute the phone by turning it face-down, and many more.

Technical specifications
Symbian OS v9.3 with S60 Platform 3rd Edition, Feature Pack 2
Quad band GSM / GPRS / EDGE: GSM/EDGE Quadband 850/900/1800/1900 MHz
Dual band UMTS / HSDPA: W-CDMA 900/2100 MHz
HSDPA 3.6 Mbit/s
Integrated GPS system
A-GPS
Digital Compass
96 MB RAM
3.2 megapixel camera, Video – VGA 640×480
QCIF camera for video calling
Bluetooth 2.0 with EDR & A2DP
USB 2.0 (micro USB)
microSD
Stereo FM radio and support for Visual Radio
Push to Talk over Cellular (PoC)
Music Player supporting MP3, AAC, eAAC+, WMA files
Mono speaker

Users can determine the software version in the phone by pressing *#0000# on the keypad.

See also
 List of Nokia products

References

External links

 NAVTEQ Website
 Nokia Asia Website
 Nokia 6210 Navigator – Official Site(Archived)

Nokia smartphones
Slider phones
Mobile phones introduced in 2008